Khutag-Öndör is a sum (district) of Bulgan Province in northern Mongolia. In 2009, its population was 4,591.

Climate

Khutag-Öndör has a humid continental climate (Köppen climate classification Dwb) with warm summers and severely cold winters. Most precipitation falls in the summer as rain, with some snow in the adjacent months of May and September. Winters are very dry.

References

External links

Districts of Bulgan Province